The 1925 Buffalo Bisons football team represented the University of Buffalo as an independent during the 1925 college football season. Led by Russell Carrick in his second season as head coach, the team compiled a record of 3–4–1.

Schedule

References

Buffalo
Buffalo Bulls football seasons
Buffalo Bison football